Jamestown is a city in and the county seat of Fentress County, Tennessee, United States. The population of the city was 1,959 at the 2010 census.

History

Jamestown was established in 1823 as a county seat for Fentress County. It was incorporated as a city in 1837. Both Fentress County and Jamestown are named for prominent local politician James Fentress (1763–1843), who made the appeal for the new county to be carved out of Overton and Morgan counties.

Jamestown was built upon the site of a semi-permanent Cherokee village, which probably made use of the many natural rock shelters in the area. Before the founding of Jamestown, the area was known as "Sand Springs" for the many bubbling springs located within the city. The last remaining spring is located in the Mark Twain City Park, just northeast of the county courthouse. This spring provided water to the family of John M. Clemens, father of noted author Samuel L. Clemens (Mark Twain), before they moved to Missouri. John Clemens served as the first circuit court clerk. He also drew the plans for the first courthouse and jail.

During the American Civil War, Fentress County provided four companies for the Confederate Army and three for the Union Army. The notorious "Tinker Dave" Beaty formed his Union scout company in Fentress County to battle with the pro-Confederate guerrilla's led by Champ Ferguson. Neither of these companies were ever mustered into the armies they supported, and they spent most of their time fighting each other.

World War I hero Sgt. Alvin C. York was born and raised in Fentress County. He built the Alvin C. York Agricultural Institute, a high school in Jamestown. It is one of four state-funded schools in Tennessee.

Geography
Jamestown is located at  (36.429082, -84.932414).  The city is located along the western edge of the Cumberland Plateau near the center of Fentress County. Streams in the eastern part of the city are part of the Big South Fork of the Cumberland River watershed, while streams in the western part of the city flow into the upper Obey River watershed.

Jamestown is situated at the intersection of U.S. Route 127, which connects the city with Crossville to the south and Kentucky to the north, and State Route 52, which connects the city with Livingston to the west and Allardt to the southeast.  State Route 154 connects the Jamestown area with Pickett State Park to the northeast.

Demographics

2020 census

As of the 2020 United States census, there were 1,935 people, 875 households, and 396 families residing in the city.

2000 census
As of the census of 2000, there were 1,839 people, 881 households, and 446 families residing in the city. The population density was 634.4 people per square mile (244.8/km2). There were 1,007 housing units at an average density of 347.4 per square mile (134.1/km2). The racial makeup of the city was 98.42% White, 0.71% African American, 0.05% Asian, 0.05% from other races, and 0.76% from two or more races. Hispanic or Latino of any race were 0.98% of the population.

There were 881 households, out of which 21.5% had children under the age of 18 living with them, 30.6% were married couples living together, 17.1% had a female householder with no husband present, and 49.3% were non-families. 47.8% of all households were made up of individuals, and 21.5% had someone living alone who was 65 years of age or older. The average household size was 1.91 and the average family size was 2.70.

In the city, the population was spread out, with 17.9% under the age of 18, 9.6% from 18 to 24, 24.0% from 25 to 44, 23.8% from 45 to 64, and 24.7% who were 65 years of age or older. The median age was 44 years. For every 100 females, there were 77.0 males. For every 100 females age 18 and over, there were 71.2 males.

The median income for a household in the city was $12,136, and the median income for a family was $18,714. Males had a median income of $23,750 versus $16,094 for females. The per capita income for the city was $11,135. About 28.9% of families and 35.6% of the population were below the poverty line, including 44.8% of those under age 18 and 27.6% of those age 65 or over.

In 2010, Jamestown had the sixth-lowest median household income of all places in the United States with a population over 1,000.

Media
Jamestown has radio stations WCLC-FM/105.1, WDEB/1500 & WDEB-FM/103.9.  It also has a low-power FM station, WSAB-LP/92.5.
The local newspaper serving Jamestown is the Fentress Courier, published each Wednesday in print and on the internet.

Events
Jamestown is the headquarters for the World's Longest Yardsale, also known as the 127 Corridor Sale.

References

External links

 Municipal Technical Advisory Service entry for Jamestown — information on local government, elections, and link to charter
 The Fentress Courier
 The World's Longest Yardsale

Cities in Tennessee
Cities in Fentress County, Tennessee
County seats in Tennessee
Populated places established in 1828